Martin Müller (born 5 April 1974 in Forst) is a German former professional road bicycle racer who last rode for UCI ProTour team . Müller retired after the 2009 season.

Major results

 German U19 Road Race Champion (1992)
 Rheinland-Pfalz Rundfahrt – stage 7 (1997)
 GP Landwirtschaft (1997)
 Karkonosze Tour – stage 4 (1999)
 Niedersachsen-Rundfahrt – 1 stage (2000)

External links 

1974 births
Living people
Sportspeople from Forst (Lausitz)
People from Bezirk Cottbus
German male cyclists
Cyclists from Brandenburg